Rabbi Shlomo Halberstam (1847 –1905) was a Hasidic Rebbe, founder of the Hasidic dynasty of Bobov. He was the son of Rabbi Myer Noson Halberstam (1827-1855). Rabbi Shlomo was a grandson of the Divrei Chaim of Sanz (1793-1876), a Hasidic sage of the 19th century whose influence established the groundwork for many other Galician Hasidic movements.

Halberstam became an orphan at age eight, and lived with his grandfather, the Divrei Chaim, for most of his early life. He married the daughter of Rabbi Yehoshua of Kaminka. In later life he re-married; his second wife was the daughter of Rabbi Menashe of Drohobycz. His mentors in chasidut were his two grandfathers, the Divrei Chaim of Sanz and Rabbi Eliezer Horowitz of Dzikov.

He became the rabbi of Bukowsko in 1864, Oświęcim in 1879, Vishnitsa in 1880, where he set up a large yeshiva in 1881 and began to serve as a rebbe (Admor) there. He left Vishnitsa and re-established his Yeshiva in Bobov where he was appointed rabbi in 1892. 

He died in the summer of 1905 (1 Tamuz 5665 on the Hebrew calendar).

Rebbes of Bobov
 Shlomo Halberstam (1847 - 1905) grandson of the Sanzer Rebbe, Chaim Halberstam
 Ben Zion Halberstam (1874 - 1941)
 Shlomo Halberstam (1907 - 2000)
 Naftali Halberstam (1931 - 2005)
 Ben Zion Aryeh Leibish Halberstam, younger son of Shlomo Halberstam

See also
Bobov Synagogue (Kraków)
Bobowa (in Poland)
Borough Park, Brooklyn

1847 births
1905 deaths
Rebbes of Bobov
Polish Hasidic rabbis
Hasidic rabbis in Europe
Jews from Galicia (Eastern Europe)